Tening HQ is a village in the Peren district of Nagaland, India. It is the headquarters of the Tening Circle.

Demographics 

According to the 2011 census of India, Tening HQ has 448 households. The effective literacy rate (i.e. the literacy rate of population excluding children aged 6 and below) is 78.37%.

References 

Villages in Tening Circle